Union Chapel is a village in the town of East Brookfield, Worcester County, Massachusetts, United States.

Notes

Villages in Worcester County, Massachusetts
Villages in Massachusetts